Gang Man-gu (born 1 July 1969) is a South Korean rower. He competed in the men's coxed four event at the 1988 Summer Olympics. He attended Korea National Sport University. He subsequently represented South Korea at the 1989 World Rowing Championships.

References

1969 births
Living people
Korea National Sport University alumni
South Korean male rowers
Olympic rowers of South Korea
Rowers at the 1988 Summer Olympics
Place of birth missing (living people)